IRBP may refer to two proteins:
Iron-responsive element binding protein, involved in the regulation of iron metabolism; and
RBP3 (Retinol-binding protein 3 = Interphotoreceptor retinoid-binding protein = Interstitial retinol-binding protein), an eye protein commonly used as a phylogenetic marker.